Lounge Lizards is the first album by The Lounge Lizards. It features hectic instrumental jazz. The songs are mostly composed by band leader and saxophone player John Lurie. The album artwork was designed by the English graphic designer Peter Saville.

Track listing
All songs written by John Lurie, except where noted.

"Incident on South Street" – 3:21
"Harlem Nocturne" (Earle Hagen) – 2:04
"Do the Wrong Thing" (John Lurie, Steve Piccolo) – 2:39
"Au Contraire Arto" – 3:22
"Well You Needn't" (Thelonious Monk) – 1:53
"Ballad" – 3:22
"Wangling" – 2:58
"Conquest of Rar" (John Lurie, Evan Lurie, Anton Fier) – 3:12
"Demented" – 2:01
"I Remember Coney Island" – 3:27
"Fatty Walks" – 2:51
"Epistrophy" (Thelonious Monk, Kenneth Clarke) – 4:12
"You Haunt Me" – 3:40

Personnel
Lounge Lizards
 John Lurie – alto saxophone
 Evan Lurie – keyboards
 Steve Piccolo – bass
 Arto Lindsay – guitar
 Anton Fier – drums
Technical
 Frank Laico – engineering
 Ted Brosnan – engineering
 Peter Saville – design
 Fran Pelzman – photography

References

1981 debut albums
The Lounge Lizards albums
Albums produced by Teo Macero
E.G. Records albums